Phantom Punch may refer to:

 The punch that ended the second fight of Muhammad Ali versus Sonny Liston
 Neil Lefner's iconic sports photograph of Ali taunting the stricken Liston to "get up and fight"
 Phantom Punch (film), a 2008 Sonny Liston biopic starring Ving Rhames
 Phantom Punch (album), the fourth album by Sondre Lerche